Fleming is an unincorporated community in Redding Township, Jackson County, Indiana.

History
Fleming had its start by the building of the railroad through that territory. A post office was established at Fleming in 1892, and remained in operation until it was discontinued in 1904.

Geography

References

Unincorporated communities in Jackson County, Indiana
Unincorporated communities in Indiana